The Provinces of Prussia were the main administrative divisions of Prussia from 1815 to 1946. Prussia's province system was introduced in the Stein-Hardenberg Reforms in 1815, and were mostly organized from duchies and historical regions. Provinces were divided into several Regierungsbezirke, sub-divided into Kreise (districts), and then into Gemeinden (townships) at the lowest level. Provinces constituted the highest level of administration in the Kingdom of Prussia and Free State of Prussia until 1933, when Nazi Germany established de facto direct rule over provincial politics, and were formally abolished in 1946 following World War II. The Prussian provinces became the basis for many federal states of Germany, and the states of Brandenburg, Lower Saxony, and Schleswig-Holstein are direct successors of provinces.

History
Following the dissolution of the Holy Roman Empire in 1806 and the Congress of Vienna in 1815, the various German states gained nominal sovereignty. However, the reunification process that culminated in the creation of the German Empire in 1871, produced a country that was constituted of several principalities and dominated by one of them, the Kingdom of Prussia after it had ultimately defeated its Austrian rival. Its territory covered some 60 percent of the territory that was to become the German Reich.

German Confederation

The German Confederation was established at the Congress of Vienna in 1815 and the Kingdom of Prussia was a member until the dissolution in 1866 following the Austro-Prussian War.

The Prussian state was initially subdivided into ten provinces. The Prussian government appointed the heads of each province known as Oberpräsident (i.e. High Commissioner). The Oberpräsident represented the Prussian government in the province, and was busy with implementing and supervising central prerogatives of the Prussian government. The provinces of Prussia were further subdivided into government districts (Regierungsbezirke), subject to the High Commissioner. As to self-rule each province also had a provincial diet (Provinziallandtag in German), the members of which were elected in indirect election by county councillors and city councillors of the constituent rural counties and independent cities.

Western Provinces:
  Jülich-Cleves-Berg (Cologne), until 1822; regions: Cleves [till 1821], Cologne and Düsseldorf
  Lower Rhine (Koblenz), Grand Duchy, until 1822; regions: , Coblentz and Trier
  Saxony (Magdeburg); regions: , Magdeburg and 
  Westphalia (Münster); regions: Arnsberg, Minden and Münster
In 1822 the Rhine Province was created from the merger of the Lower Rhine and Jülich-Cleves-Berg provinces.
  Rhine Province (Koblenz); regions: Aachen, Cologne, Düsseldorf, Coblentz and Trier

Eastern Provinces (East Elbia):
  Brandenburg (Potsdam, Berlin [1827-1843]); regions:  [till 1821], Frankfurt and 
  East Prussia (Königsberg in Prussia); regions: Gumbinnen and Königsberg
  Pomerania (Stettin); regions: Köslin, Stettin and Stralsund
  Posen (Posen), Grand Duchy of Posen until 1848; regions: Bromberg and Posen
  Silesia (Breslau); regions: , Liegnitz, Oppeln and  [till 1820]
  West Prussia (Danzig); regions: Danzig and Marienwerder
In 1829 the Province of Prussia was created by the merger of East Prussia and West Prussia, lasting until 1878 when they were again separated. Congruent with the Kingdom of Prussia proper (i.e. former Ducal and Royal Prussia), its territory, like the province of Posen, was not part of the German Confederation.
  Province of Prussia (Königsberg in Prussia); regions: Danzig, Gumbinnen, Königsberg and Marienwerder

In 1850 the Province of Hohenzollern in Southern Germany, was created from the annexed principalities of Hohenzollern-Hechingen and Hohenzollern-Sigmaringen.
  Hohenzollern (Sigmaringen); region: Sigmaringen

In 1866, following the Austro-Prussian War, Prussia annexed several German States that had been allied with Austria and, together with previously occupied Danish territory, organized them into three new provinces:
  Hanover (Hanover; constituted from the Kingdom of Hanover); regions: , Hanover, Lüneburg,  and Stade 
  Hesse-Nassau (Kassel; constituted from the Free City of Frankfurt upon Main, Electorate of Hesse, Hesse-Homburg and the Duchy of Nassau); regions: Kassel and Wiesbaden
  Schleswig-Holstein (Kiel; constituted from the Duchy of Holstein and the Duchy of Schleswig); regions: Holstein (till 1868) and Schleswig; in 1876 Saxe-Lauenburg, a separate German state, was merged in.

German Empire

The outcome of the Austro-Prussian War put an end to the aspirations of a grand unified state consisting of all German-speaking states. Instead the North German Confederation was created under Prussian leadership. Following the Franco-Prussian War and the incorporation of the southern states of Bavaria, Baden and Württemberg into the confederation, the German Empire was proclaimed in 1871.

From 1875 the provinces were bodies combining regional home rule through representatives delegated from each rural and urban district ( and ), forming the provincial diet with a 6-year term, which elected from its midst a head of this self-administration, the Landesdirektor (with a 6 to 12-year term), and a provincial government as well as part of the superordinated overall Prussian royal administration, supervising - on a provincial range - the self-governing municipalities and counties as well as each governorate (mere supervising bodies of the Prussian government). For this purpose, the respective Prussian minister of interior affairs appointed a High Commissioner to each province, who fulfilled his task with the help of a Prussian government-appointed provincial council.

In 1881 the final province of the Kingdom of Prussia was established when Berlin was separated from Brandenburg.

  Berlin (On 1 April 1881 the city was separated from Brandenburg to become a city-province. Its lord mayor carried out the duties of a Landesdirektor in the other provinces, while the city council doubled as the provincial committee. The Prussian government-appointed chief of police served as the High Commissioner of Berlin.)

In 1918 following World War I the German Empire was dissolved and replaced by the Weimar Republic. The following were the existing Prussian provinces:

  Berlin 
  Brandenburg (Potsdam; from 1881 on without Berlin, but provincial offices remained in Berlin); regions: Frankfurt and  
  East Prussia (Königsberg in Prussia); regions: Allenstein (as of 1905), Gumbinnen and Königsberg
  Hanover (Hanover;); regions: , Hanover, Lüneburg,  and Stade 
  Hesse-Nassau (Kassel;); regions: Kassel and Wiesbaden
  Hohenzollern (Sigmaringen); region: Sigmaringen
  Pomerania (Stettin); regions: Köslin, Stettin and Stralsund
  Posen (Posen); regions: Bromberg and Posen
  Rhineland (Düsseldorf as to provincial self-rule, Koblenz as to High Commissioner offices); regions: , Cologne, Düsseldorf, Koblenz and Trier
  Saxony (Magdeburg); regions: , Magdeburg and 
  Schleswig-Holstein (Kiel;); regions: Holstein (till 1868) and Schleswig
  Silesia (Breslau); regions: , Liegnitz and Oppeln 
  Westphalia (Münster); regions: Arnsberg, Minden and Münster
  West Prussia (Danzig;); regions: Danzig and Marienwerder

Weimar Republic

After the fall of the German Empire the Kingdom of Prussia was reconstituted with a republican government as the Free State of Prussia. The Free State promoted the democratisation of the provinces, the provincial parliaments (Provinziallandtage) were elected in direct elections by the voters, unlike before when elected county councillors chose from their midst members for the provincial parliaments.

Prussia had to cede virtually all territory belonging to the provinces of Posen and West Prussia to the newly created state of Poland and the League of Nations mandate of the Free City of Danzig. Smaller areas had been ceded to Belgium (East Cantons, formerly Rhineland), Czechoslovakia (Hlučín Region, formerly Silesia), Denmark (Northern Schleswig, formerly Schleswig-Holstein), the League of Nations mandate of the Memel Territory (formerly East Prussia), Poland (eastern Upper Silesia, formerly Prov. of Silesia), and the Mandatory Saar (League of Nations) (formerly Rhineland).

Following the Nazi seizure of power in 1933, the Law on the Reconstruction of the Reich was enacted on 30 January 1934. This formally de-federalized the German Reich and created a centralized state. Prussia and its provinces formally continued to exist, but the state Landtag and provincial assemblies were abolished and governance was placed under the direct control of a Reichsstatthalter (Reich Governor). The following is a summary of the changes in the Prussian provinces between 1919 and 1945:

  Berlin (in 1920 the city was considerably extended (Prussian Greater Berlin Act) at the expense of Brandenburg)
  Brandenburg (Berlin); regions: Frankfurt and  
  East Prussia (Königsberg in Prussia); regions: Allenstein, Gumbinnen, Königsberg and West Prussia (1922-1939)
  Hanover (Hanover; in 1921 Pyrmont, previously a district of the Free State of Waldeck-Pyrmont, was merged in); regions: , Hanover, Lüneburg,  and Stade 
  Hesse-Nassau (Kassel; in 1929 the Free State of Waldeck, previously a German state of its own, was merged in); regions: Kassel and Wiesbaden. In July 1944, the province was partitioned into two new provinces along the lines of its regions: the Province of Kurhessen (Kassel); region: Kassel; and the Province of Nassau (Wiesbaden); region: Wiesbaden.
  Hohenzollern (Sigmaringen); region: Sigmaringen
  Lower Silesia (Breslau; merged with the Province of Upper Silesia to form the unified Province of Silesia between 1938 and 1941); regions:  and Liegnitz 
  Pomerania (Stettin); regions: Köslin, Stettin, Posen-West Prussia (as of 1938) and Stralsund (till 1932)
  Posen-West Prussia (Schneidemühl; created in 1922 from parts of the provinces Posen and West Prussia that had not been ceded to Poland, the province was dissolved in 1938 with its territory being mainly incorporated into Pomerania, and two exclaves into Brandenburg and Silesia.); region:  
  Rhineland (Düsseldorf as to provincial self-rule, Koblenz as to High Commissioner offices); regions: , Cologne, Düsseldorf, Koblenz and Trier
In July 1944, the province was partitioned along the lines of its regions. Erfurt was ceded to Thuringia, while the bulk of the province was divided into the Province of Magdeburg (Magdeburg) and the Province of Halle-Merseburg (Merseburg) 
  Schleswig-Holstein (Kiel; in 1920 Northern Schleswig was ceded to Denmark); region: Schleswig
  Upper Silesia (Oppeln [1919-1938], Kattowitz [1941-1945]; merged with the Province of Lower Silesia to form the unified Province of Silesia between 1938 and 1941); region: Oppeln 
  Westphalia (Münster); regions: Arnsberg, Minden and Münster

Prussia did not survive the defeat and the division of Germany following the end of World War II in 1945 and was formally abolished in February 1947. Several of its provinces attained statehood or became a part of other post-war states in East Germany and West Germany.

References

 
Kingdom of Prussia
Subdivisions of Prussia